Ralph Widdrington (c. 1640 – 22 June 1718) was one of the eight sons (10 children) of William Widdrington, 1st Baron Widdrington and his wife, Mary ( Thorold).

He was commissioned Ensign in the Earl of Ogle's regiment in 1667, his brothers Edward and Roger being commissioned in the same regiment at the same time. Burke's (extinct) Peerage states, following earlier genealogies, that he lost his sight in "the Dutch War" without stating which one. In the light of Widdrington's subsequent career, that seems unlikely: The Earl of Ogle's regiment is not recorded as in action in the 1665–1667 War and, in 1671, Ralph Widdrington was commissioned Captain in the Portsmouth garrison company. 

Thereafter, he was at Berwick garrison as Lieutenant to the Duke of Newcastle. Captain George Carleton's memoirs go further and state that Widdrington lost his life at the Siege of Maastricht in 1676, as a volunteer in the Dutch Army. Ralph may have been a volunteer in the Dutch Army then, although that is uncertain, but it was his brother Roger Widdrington who was killed at Maastricht.

In 1685, he became Member of Parliament for Berwick upon Tweed and remained so until 1689. Immediately prior to King Charles' death (in February, 1685) the town of Berwick had petitioned for a new Charter, and There was present at the delivery Captain Ralph Widdrington and Captain Biggerstaffe, but they stood aside and were taken noe notice of. However, they two are the towne's irreconcileable enemies, and they endeavour to have the Charter so drawn that all the towne's grounds may be given to the garrison, and that all the burgesses be no burgesses, and only a certain number as they please to name to be inserted in the new Charter, and these only to be burgesses, and impose a parcel of justices of peace upon the town, etc.. 

According to that narrative, all of the aldermen and officers of the town, and seven score burgesses and inhabitants were removed from the voter list. In that manner, Ralph Widdrington and Philip Bickerstaffe were returned to Parliament. Widdrington probably never took his seat, was removed from all offices in 1688, and followed King James overseas.

In or about 1693, he returned to England, and was granted permission to remain. He does not appear to have taken an active role in politics or in Jacobite activities after his return although the family William, 4th Baron and his brothers Charles and Peregrine took part in the Jacobite rising of 1715 for which the Widdrington family was attaindered as Catholic and Jacobite. He died in London, in 1718.

References

1640s births
1718 deaths
English MPs 1685–1687
People from Widdrington, Northumberland
Younger sons of barons